The Trials of Apollo is a pentalogy of fantasy adventure and mythological fiction novels written by American author Rick Riordan that collectively form a sequel to the Heroes of Olympus series. It is set in the same world as the Riordan tales  Percy Jackson and  Heroes of Olympus and the references to characters and happenings from earlier series prove this. A supplementary book, Camp Jupiter Classified, has also been released in addition to the main series.

The first book in the series, The Hidden Oracle, was released on May 3, 2016. The second book in the series, The Dark Prophecy, was released on May 2, 2017. The third book in the series, The Burning Maze, was released on May 1, 2018. The fourth book in the series, The Tyrant's Tomb, was released on September 24, 2019. The fifth book in the series, The Tower of Nero, was released on October 6, 2020.

Synopsis
The series follows the trials of the god Apollo, who has been turned into a mortal named Lester Papadopoulos as punishment from his father and king of the gods Zeus. Lester (Apollo) must meet some new friends and train at Camp Half-Blood, save and return 5 undiscovered oracles that have gone dark, and get back to his true form.  Zeus is angry at Apollo for a variety of reasons, most notably for the younger god's allowing his Roman descendant Octavian to rise to power during The Heroes of Olympus series by giving him his blessing. The final book of The Heroes of Olympus, titled The Blood of Olympus, takes place about six months before The Trials of Apollo.

Books

The Hidden Oracle

The Hidden Oracle is the first book of the series. It is told in first-person by the main character Apollo, and it uses haikus for chapter titles. The book was released on May 3, 2016.

The book opens with Apollo landing in a dumpster in an alley in New York City, in the form of a mortal teenager named Lester Papadopoulos because of the events leading up to the war between the Greeks and the Romans. After shenanigans happen, he meets Meg McCaffrey. Believing that he must only undertake a simple quest to regain his immortality, Apollo and Meg travel to Camp Half-Blood with the help of Percy Jackson, where they learn most of the world's Oracles have stopped working. The two undertake a quest to locate and protect a remaining oracle, Dodona, and also hoping to learn how to help the other oracles and regain Apollo's immortality. Apollo also finds out that the first oracle he has to save is heavily guarded by the mysterious 'Beast' who happens to be the first of the three evil Roman-emperors-turned-Gods, the Roman emperor Nero, who is also the stepfather of Meg McCaffrey.

The Dark Prophecy

The Dark Prophecy is the second book in the series. It was released on May 2, 2017.

The book continues the story of Apollo as the mortal Lester, as he leaves the safety of Camp Half-Blood and journeys across North America to restore the remaining four Oracles and learn how to defeat the Triumvirate of Roman emperors-turned-god while being helped by Leo Valdez, Calypso and Festus the bronze dragon, the Hunters of Artemis, and some new characters. Apollo has to face and defeat the second Triumvirate emperor – Commodus, with whom Apollo shares an awkward and regretful past to obtain the Throne of Memory for his next prophecy. Apollo travels to the Oracle's cave, gets his prophecy and comes back and defends himself and his friends from Commodus, driving him from Indianapolis and blinding in the process; as he reveals a sliver of his true godly form.

The Burning Maze 

The Burning Maze is the third book in the series. It was released on May 1, 2018.

The book follows Lester Papadopoulos/Apollo, Meg McCaffrey and Grover Underwood while they try to rescue Herophile, an Oracle that speaks only in puzzles, from the most infamous Roman emperor, Caligula. After fleeing the labyrinth, Apollo dreams about the Oracle saying that he must save her even though it is a trap. When he wakes up, he finds himself in Grover's base. When Meg wakes up, they find the line from the prophecy, "Demeter's daughter finds her ancient roots", to occur. Apollo and Grover go out to try to find Gleeson Hedge in an army store called Macro's Military Madness. They then find out that Macro, the store owner, is actually Naevius Sutorius Macro, working for Caligula. He attacks them with an army of automatons. By activating "command sequence: Daedalus twenty-three", they defeat Macro with his own robots. They then navigate the maze by enlisting the help of Piper McLean and Jason Grace. After a raid on Caligula's fleet of ships that results in Jason's death, Apollo and Meg steal a pair of Caligula's sandals, which let people navigate the Labyrinth. Piper, upset over Jason's death, is unable to help them further. The next day, Grover, Meg, and Apollo walk the Labyrinth using Caligula's shoes. They free Herophile, discover a new prophecy, and free Helios. Piper comes back and kills Medea, an evil and murderous sorceress who was working with Caligula (also Helios's grandchild). The book ends with Leo arriving from Camp Jupiter, learning about Jason's death, and Apollo and Meg going to San Francisco while Gleeson Hedge, Mellie, Baby Chuck, Piper, and her dad set off to Oklahoma, with a ride from Leo and Festus.

The Tyrant's Tomb 
The Tyrant's Tomb is the fourth book in the series. It was released on September 24, 2019.

Plot 
The story is set at Camp Jupiter in the San Francisco Bay Area. The story starts off with Apollo and Meg taking Jason's body to Camp Jupiter. On their way to Camp Jupiter, they are attacked by eurynomos, but a girl with pink hair arrives with dryads and a faun and kills the Eurynomous. She then introduces herself as Lavinia and says she will take them to Camp Jupiter. After that, all the dryads and fauns start to leave. But as the last faun, Don tries to leave, Lavinia spots him and said that he will not leave because of what he is supposed to owe Lavinia for helping him. They carry Jason's tomb to the tunnel where she knows a shortcut to Camp Jupiter.

Suddenly, Hazel as well as two more euronymous come. They enter the tunnel, while Hazel tries to kill the euronymous. Apollo tries to sing a song to help Hazel but is scratched in the belly by a Eurynomous before Hazel kills it. Due to him being scratched, Apollo starts to turn into a corpse. Hazel sees Jason's coffin and is terrified because she had a dream about Jason being killed by Emperor Caligula. After that, the five carry Jason's tomb and arrive in Camp Jupiter where they are greeted by Frank Zhang and Reyna Ramirez-Arellano while everyone watches Jason's coffin being carried. The camp holds a funeral for Jason, with Apollo singing a song about his quest and touching everyone. They all decide that they will carry on with Jason's plan to build temples honoring the gods.

Apollo then faints and has a dream about Caligula and Commodus discussing their plan about either taking Camp Jupiter without conflict or destroying it using Greek fire explosions by mortars on Caligula's yachts. Apollo finds himself in a bed where Meg explains that he had been asleep for about a day and a half. There is a funeral for Jason that night, where Lupa comes and tells Lester to get divine help to defeat their enemies. Apollo and Frank go to Ella and Tyson, who were busy recreating the Sibylline Books. They get a prophecy regarding Tarquin's tomb, as they found about it in the previous prophecy. They later go to the senator where they select him, Meg, Lavinia, and Hazel to go to for a mission to find more about the final king of Rome, Tarquin, who has returned. After they find out about the old ghost King and his plans, they get more scared for the camp. They also find that Tarquin has kept the soundless god at Sutro Tower. After they return, they realize that to solve communication issues and get divine help, they need to destroy the soundless god. So a quest is issued for Apollo, Meg, and Reyna to go to Sutro Tower. But that is in the evening of the next day, and most of the morning is spent on training.

At the tower, they realize the god is Harpocrates, who had troubles with Apollo. He also has a jar containing the voice of the Sibyl of Cumae. With some difficulty, they manage to get the last breath of Harpocrates, along with Sibyl's Jar, which is required to get divine help. As they return, they are ambushed by a euronymous again, and after they manage to kill him, they are helped by Lavinia and her friends, who had escaped from the Camp earlier. Reyna and Lavinia issue "plan L" to defeat the yachts that Apollo saw in his dream. After Apollo and Meg return, they see the camp in the midst of a war. Apollo calls for divine help on Temple Hill. He decides to call Diana. Frank (the other praetor of Rome) sacrifices himself holding his firewood, killing Caligula along the way to save the other legionnaires. Apollo later kills Commodus in the grief of losing Frank. Commodus gives the order to fire. Due to "plan L", it fails and the yachts are destroyed.

Meanwhile, Tarquin had reached the bookshop where the books were being re-written, but Ella and Tyson are not there. Meg and Hazel fight Tarquin. Diana finally arrives and kills Tarquin and heals Apollo just in time. Reyna and Lavinia, along with Peaches, return. Arion rescues Frank who mysteriously survives death and Reyna Ramirez-Arellano pledges herself to the goddess Diana (Artemis) and joins the Hunters. Dakota, son of Bacchus, passes away overnight due to wounds that he got in battle. He was the longtime centurion of the Fifth Cohort. Don the faun also dies. He gets reincarnated into a laurel tree, Apollo's tree of victory. Hazel is voted as the new praetor of Camp Jupiter and Lavinia voted as centurion of the Fifth Cohort.

Apollo receives his old Godly Bow as a gift from Camp Jupiter, Meg receives seeds and they set off to New York after receiving the last and final prophecy from Ella and Tyson, which they realize is a terza rima, and they would have to find more stanzas in the East. They go in hopes to once again be reunited with their old friends from Camp Half-Blood.

The Tower of Nero 
The Tower of Nero is the fifth and final book of The Trials of Apollo. It was released on October 6, 2020.

Plot 
While returning to New York, Lester and Meg McCaffrey encounter an amphisbaena, which recites the second stanza of the Terza Rima prophecy. Within minutes, they are attacked by Nero's Gaul, Luguselwa, or Lu, and her Germani. Apollo and Meg escape with the help of Luguselwa, who turns out to be on their side. The trio reaches the Upper Eastside and decide to go to Percy Jackson for help, but they soon learn that Percy and his girlfriend Annabeth are on the West Coast. They plan on defeating Nero, which involves they fight against Lu in open daylight and Apollo pushing Lu off the building so that Nero believes that Luguselwa is on his side when she really isn't, as Nero could see it through one of the security cameras installed in a nearby building. All goes according to plan. Then, Lester and Meg reach Camp Half-Blood. The Grey Sisters recite another couplet of the Terza Rima prophecy. After they reach their destination, they find that Chiron had gone to a meeting with gods from other pantheons including Bastet from The Kane Chronicles, and Mímir from Magnus Chase and the Gods of Asgard to discuss a "common problem".

Apollo, after fainting due to exhaustion on arrival, he sees in his dream that their plan is working: Lu told Nero about the escape, and Nero gave an ultimatum to Meg and Apollo to surrender within two days or else New York, especially Manhattan, burns. The next day, with the help of the Grey Sisters' prophecy, Lester, Meg, Will Solace, and Nico di Angelo, go to meet Rachel Elizabeth Dare. There, she warns about some cattle that are standing outside. After a decision to fail Nero's Greek fire vats with the help of troglodytes (short trogs), a species of very good diggers, Rachel suddenly spouts a prophecy, the final couplet, but Python meddled with it. Suddenly, the cattle, being the Tauri Sylvestre, attack, and the five barely manage to escape. Nico helps them to reach the troglodytes via shadow travel, while Will is revealed to have the power to glow in the dark.

At the trogs' encampment underground, it is revealed that the trogs are very quick runners and diggers. Soon enough, they decide that Will, Nico, and Rachel will go with the trogs to disable the vats, and then alert Camp Half-Blood, while Meg and Apollo surrender themselves, to get closer to Nero's fasces, the source of his power and immortality, to destroy it and kill Nero. But it turned out that Nero already knew of their plan. Luguselwa's hands are cut off, and she and Apollo are thrown in prison, while Meg is forced by Nero to go to her old room in the Imperial Residences inside the Tower of Nero.

Lester, after just managing to revive Luguselwa, decides to find out more about who is guarding the fasces. It turned out to be a leontocephaline, the Persian god Mithras' creation. He guards immortality, so he requires a sacrifice of it in return to granting access to the fasces. Lu and Lester escape prison. Lu decides to give her immortality up to get the fasces, while Lester goes to save Meg.

Upstairs, he realizes that the entire lower floor area has become a battleground. Camp Half-Blood heroes have come in. Kayla and Austin help Lester to reach Meg. On the way, Lester enters the wrong room, the one with the buttons to burn up Manhattan. The button is pressed, but nothing happens, as the vats have been disabled. Nico also shows up.

After some searching, Lester runs past a laptop. Nero video calls that laptop and tells him that he has a "plan B": to release Sassanid gas, a very poisonous gas, and kill everyone in the building. Lester has to come to the throne room in fifteen minutes, or else everyone will die. Lester tells the trogs about the gas trap, who run to disable it.

Meanwhile, Lester reaches the throne room, where all the adopted children of Nero are present, including Meg. Nero orders the dryads there to kill Lester or be killed by the Imperial children. However, Meg stops them and chooses to stand by Apollo. Suddenly, Nico shows up with the Tauri Silvestri, who has become a pawn of Nico. Nico orders it to kill Nero. The bull fails, but it ends up creating a lot of chaos. Nero desperately tries to search the remote with the button to release Sassanid gas. In the middle of the chaos, one of the Imperial demigods manages to stab Lester, but he survives.

After the chaos ends, Nero finally finds the correct remote and presses the button. He laughs, but suddenly, Will, Rachel, and Lu show up, along with the trog leader and the emperor's fasces. To Nero's disbelief, the troglodytes had been successful in disabling the gas trap as well. Nero is forced to reveal the truth – he is not that powerful, and instead, he is being controlled as a pawn by Python. If he is killed, then Python would be near impossible to kill, as the entire Triumvirate’s power will go to Python. He is given a choice, fight and die a hopeless battle, or live for some more years in a large prison. He chooses the first one, but soon gets entangled in a tug of war with Lester over the fasces, which Lester was trying to break. Lester manages to project his godly powers, using which he revokes Nero's divinity and immortality, and breaks the fasces, killing him.

Camp Half-Blood stays at the Tower to help the Imperial children rehabilitate after years of abuse, but Lester has to go, as he has to quickly defeat Python. Using the Labyrinth, he manages to reach Delphi, halfway across the world, in a matter of minutes.

Lester faces off against Python for the final time. Python starts calling him Apollo, a big achievement for Lester. But Lester is quickly overpowered by the giant snake, who utters a prophecy, saying Apollo will fall, and loses his bow. The arrow of Dodona sacrifices itself to defeat Python and finishes Python's prophecy, saying that Apollo will fall, but Apollo must rise again. Apollo manages to blind Python and make him loosen his hold on him by hitting him in the eyes with the arrow of Dodona and his elbow. Then he drags Python into Tartarus with him, fulfilling Python's recent prophecy, but in a more literal sense.

The two almost fall down into Chaos but are saved by a ledge. Apollo, who is in no mood to fight, is attacked by Python, but manages to throw him off the ledge into Chaos, destroying him forever and freeing the Oracles from his power. Apollo himself is left dangling off the edge, when the goddess of the Styx, who had followed him all along since he broke his vows on the Styx in the first book, congratulates him on learning his lesson which he realizes is to always uphold a promise that you make. Apollo becomes a god again, and, two weeks later, reappears in Olympus, where he is welcomed as an Olympian.

Apollo, now a god again, goes to meet his friends. He splits himself into multiple Apollos and goes to find them in no particular order. He visits Camp Half-Blood, where Nico and Will tell him that Nico suspects that a voice he's been hearing from Tartarus lately is his old friend the Titan Iapetus, also known as Bob, who supposedly died helping Percy and Annabeth to escape. With the help of the trogs, Nico and Will intend to travel to Tartarus to find out for sure and rescue Bob if they can. As if on cue, Rachel delivers a prophecy, which Will notes to sound bad. Apollo also visits Camp Jupiter, where Frank and Hazel are doing a great job at being praetors. Hazel gets rid of the curse on her jewels, and now they can be spent. Frank is having fun turning his cape into a sweater wrap, while Percy and Annabeth have finally reached university there. Percy studies marine biology and  Annabeth architecture, respectively. Apollo gives Percy his mom's cookies, and Percy retracts 'almost' all of the things he has said about Apollo. He visits the Union Station at Indianapolis, where Georgina is being taught by Jo how to forge blades. Reyna, who is there with the other Hunters of Artemis, tells Leo to be more mature when approaching Calypso, who is currently studying in high school and had gone to a summer camp as a counselor. The Hunters are there to hunt down the Teumessian Fox. Apollo visits Piper McLean in Oklahoma, where she has started a new life with her Dad and Shel, her new girlfriend. Apollo also visits Meg McCaffrey, who is living in Palm Springs with the dryads there, Lu, and the Imperial children, whom she is teaching gardening. The Meliais are acting as security guards. Apollo gifts Meg a unicorn, and promises her that he will come back.

Supplementary works

Camp Half-Blood Confidential
A companion book titled  Camp Half-Blood Confidential was released on May 2, 2017. It is based on background facts of Camp Half-Blood.

Camp Jupiter Classified 
The book explores the story of one of the side characters, Claudia the daughter of Cardea and legacy of Mercury, through the perspective of her personal diary.

Main characters

 Lester Papadopoulos/Apollo: The mortal teenage incarnation of the god Apollo and is the main character of the series. He has to deal with such ordinary human problems as "zits, flabby muscles, and feeling pain" once he becomes mortal. He is looking for ancient Oracles which has been missing for decades to restore in order to gain back his godhood.
 Meg McCaffrey: A twelve-year-old demigod daughter of Demeter. She is described as a colorfully dressed street urchin. She is fierce, bossy, and tight-lipped about her past. She has a fearsome protector grain spirit named Peaches. She becomes Apollo's master in The Hidden Oracle.
 Peaches: A Karpos that comes to Meg McCaffrey when she is in need.
 Will Solace: A son of the Greek god Apollo. He is the head counselor of Cabin 7 and a healer. He assists his dad and the other heroes in The Hidden Oracle and The Tower of Nero. He is dating Nico di Angelo.
 Nico di Angelo: The son of the god Hades. He assists Apollo and the other heroes in The Hidden Oracle and The Tower of Nero. He is dating Will Solace.
 Leo Valdez: A son of the god Hephaestus. He returned in The Hidden Oracle with Calypso, on his bronze fire-breathing dragon, Festus, after being missing for over six months. He assists Lester in The Dark Prophecy.
 Calypso: The daughter of the Titan Atlas. After being imprisoned on the island of Ogygia for millennia, she is rescued by Leo Valdez and brought to the mortal world. She assists Lester throughout The Dark Prophecy.
Kayla Knowles: A daughter of Apollo. Skilled archer. She is seen in The Hidden Oracle and The Tower Of Nero
Austin Lake: A demigod son of Apollo.
 Grover Underwood: A satyr, protector, seeker, and Lord of the Wild. He is summoned by Meg to guide them through the Labyrinth in The Burning Maze.
 Piper McLean: A daughter of the goddess Aphrodite. She assists the heroes in The Burning Maze.
 Jason Grace: The son of the god Jupiter. He helps Apollo, Meg and Piper in The Burning Maze. He dies while assisting Apollo and trying to fight the mighty emperor, Caligula, as he and Piper were given a prophecy stating that one of them will undergo a three letter word that starts with D, which was revealed to be “die".
 Reyna Avila Ramirez-Arellano: The daughter of the goddess Bellona, and former Praetor of the Twelfth Legion Fulminata. She assists the heroes in The Tyrant's Tomb, where she then becomes a Hunter of Artemis.
 Hazel Levesque: The daughter of the god Pluto. She assists the heroes in The Tyrant's Tomb, where she then becomes Praetor of the Twelfth Legion Fulminata alongside Frank Zhang. Hazel is dating Frank.
 Lavinia Asimov: The daughter of the muse Terpsichore. She assists the heroes in The Tyrant's Tomb, where she then becomes Centurion of the Fifth Cohort.
 Frank Zhang: The son of the god Mars, indirect descendant of Poseidon/Neptune, and Praetor of the Twelfth Legion Fulminata. He assists the heroes in The Tyrant's Tomb, where he burns his stick of life, killing Triumvirate Emperor Caligula. Frank is dating Hazel.
 Percy Jackson: The son of the god Poseidon. Apollo intended for him to be his master, but he was not interested in being part of another Great Prophecy. He helps Apollo and Meg by guiding them to Camp Half-Blood, thereby starting them on their journey and series of quests ahead.

Future 
Rick Riordan is collaborating with writer Mark Oshiro for a new novel in the Camp Half-Blood Chronicles, set to follow Nico and Will travelling together to Tartarus to rescue the Titan Bob. The book was announced to bear the title The Sun and the Star on September 23, 2022, with its release set for May 2, 2023.

See also
 Muses in popular culture

References

 
Book series introduced in 2016
Young adult novel series
Pentalogies